State Route 217 (SR 217) is a  north–south state highway that lies along the eastern edge of the Dresden city limits in Weakley County, Tennessee.

Route description

SR 217 begins as County Maintenance Road in Dresden at an intersection with SR 22, directly beside Dresden High School. It heads north to leave Dresden and pass through wooded areas to come to an intersection and have a short concurrency with SR 54, where SR 217 very briefly renters the Dresden city limits. The highway then heads north through farmland along Klutts Road to come to an end at an intersection with SR 89. The entire route of SR 217 is a two-lane highway.

Major intersections

References

217
Transportation in Weakley County, Tennessee